Russell Loren Meacham (born January 27, 1968) is a former professional baseball pitcher. He played all or parts of eight seasons in Major League Baseball between 1991 and 2001.

Professional career

Early career 
Meacham was drafted by the Detroit Tigers in the 33rd round of the 1987 Major League Baseball Draft.

Major league career 
He made his major league debut for the Tigers in 1991, and was used as both a starter and reliever. Meacham had the most relief wins in the AL in 1992 with 10. During the remainder of his major league career, he was used almost exclusively in relief, with the exception of five starts in 1996 while he was with the Seattle Mariners. After spending three entire seasons (1997-99) in Triple-A, Meacham resurfaced with the Houston Astros in May 2000.

Independent leagues 
After his MLB career ended in 2001, Meacham continued to pitch in independent leagues for several years. Meacham was a player in the Golden Baseball League playing for the Yuma Scorpions for two seasons. Meacham then retired and became their first base coach for one year, then he left Yuma to be the pitching coach for the Vermont Lake Monsters. He was released after the 2008 season, even though he helped the Lake Monsters to one of the lowest ERAs of the league. Meacham returned to pitch in one game for the GBL's Tijuana Cimarrones in 2010.

Book 
Rusty collaborated on a baseball instruction book/DVD which became available in June 2011.

External links
, or Retrosheet, or Physics-Pitching-Paperback-DVD-Psychology

1968 births
Living people
American expatriate baseball players in Canada
Baseball players from Florida
Bristol Tigers players
Detroit Tigers players
Durham Bulls players
Fayetteville Generals players
Grosseto Baseball Club players
American expatriate baseball players in Italy
Houston Astros players
Indian River State Pioneers baseball players
Indianapolis Indians players
Kansas City Royals players
Lakeland Tigers players
London Tigers players
Long Island Ducks players
Major League Baseball pitchers
Memphis Redbirds players
Nashua Pride players
Nashville Sounds players
New Orleans Zephyrs players
Omaha Royals players
Pawtucket Red Sox players
People from Stuart, Florida
Seattle Mariners players
Tacoma Rainiers players
Tampa Bay Devil Rays players
Tijuana Cimarrones players
Toledo Mud Hens players
Yuma Scorpions players
American expatriate baseball players in Mexico
American expatriate baseball players in Taiwan
Chinatrust Whales players